Runkel was a German county during the Middle Ages. It held a territory extending from the Lahn river at the town of Runkel northwards past Schupbach. To the south of this territory was the County of Limburg (which passed to the Archbishopric of Trier in the early 15th century), the County of Hadamar to the northwest, and the County of Weilburg to the west (both of which belonged to the Counts and Dukes of Nassau). Also part of the County was an exclave located to the east of Villmar. It was bordered by the County of Limburg to the south and west, and Weilburg to the northeast.

Runkel became a County in 1219. It was inherited by the Counts of Wied in 1521.  With the partition of that County in 1698, it passed to the Counts of Wied-Runkel.  Wied-Runkel was mediatised to the Dukes of Nassau-Weilburg in 1806.

Counts of Runkel (1219–1521)
 Siegfried III (1219–27)
 Theodoric I (1227–?)
 Siegfried (?–1228)
???
 Theodoric II (1305–25)
???
 Henry (1351–61)
???
 Theodoric III (1370–1403) with...
 Siegfried (1375–88)
 Frederick (1403–40) with...
 Theodoric IV (1403–60)
 John (1460–1521)

Counties of the Holy Roman Empire

de:Runkel
nl:Runkel